The Preston Main Post Office, located at 55 E. Oneida St. in Preston, Idaho, was built in 1940.  It was listed on the National Register of Historic Places in 1989 as US Post Office-Preston Main.

Its Classical Revival design is credited to Louis A. Simon.

The interior includes a New Deal mural depicting U.S. cavalry attacking and burning a Native American village, titled "The Battle of Bear River".  The approximately  mural was painted by Edmond J. Fitzgerald in 1941.

References

Post office buildings on the National Register of Historic Places in Idaho
Neoclassical architecture in Idaho
Government buildings completed in 1940
Franklin County, Idaho